Bardiya was a son of Cyrus the Great.

Bardiya may also refer to:

 Bardiya District, Nepal
 Bardiya National Park, Nepal

See also 
Bardia (disambiguation)